is a Japanese alpine skier. He competed at the 1964 Winter Olympics and the 1968 Winter Olympics.

References

1943 births
Living people
Japanese male alpine skiers
Olympic alpine skiers of Japan
Alpine skiers at the 1964 Winter Olympics
Alpine skiers at the 1968 Winter Olympics
Sportspeople from Tokyo
20th-century Japanese people